Selena Milošević (born 9 June 1989) is a Croatian handball player for RK Podravka Koprivnica and the Croatian national team.

She participated at the 2018 European Women's Handball Championship.

References

1989 births
Living people
Sportspeople from Pula
People from Rovinj
Croatian female handball players
ŽRK Zamet players
RK Podravka Koprivnica players
21st-century Croatian women